August Petri (born 1878, date of death unknown) was a German fencer. He won a gold medal in the team sabre event at the 1906 Intercalated Games.

References

1878 births
Year of death missing
German male fencers
Olympic fencers of Germany
Olympic gold medalists for Germany
Medalists at the 1906 Intercalated Games
Fencers at the 1906 Intercalated Games
Fencers at the 1908 Summer Olympics